The Lake Champlain and St. Lawrence Junction Railway was a historic Canadian narrow-gauge railway operating in the Richelieu River valley of Quebec.  The 1871 charter of the Philipsburg, Farnham and Yamaska Railway Company was renamed in 1875 and commenced operation between Stanbridge and Saint-Guillaume in October 1879.  The  line was leased to the South Eastern Railway (SER) in 1880.  The rail line and locomotives were converted to standard gauge in 1881.  The railway economy was based on agricultural products including hay shipped to cities of the eastern United States as feed for horses pulling delivery wagons.  The line was leased to the Canadian Pacific Railway in 1887 and survived into the 21st century as part of the CPR Farnham Division.

Narrow-gauge locomotives

Notes

References

Narrow gauge railways in Quebec
3 ft 6 in gauge railways in Canada
1879 establishments in Quebec